Almazora Motors Corporation also known as Almazora, or AMC, is a truck and bus body manufacturer headquartered in Carmona, Cavite, Philippines. It was established in 1925. It is the largest bus body maker in the Philippines, based on current annual vehicle sales. Competitors of the company are Del Monte Motor Works, Inc.; Santarosa Motor Works, Inc.; and Hino Motors Philippines.

History
The company's history dates back to 1900, when Canado Almazora sold horse-driven carriages under Carroceria de Almazora. In 1925, Perfecto Almazora, son of Canado, took over the company and evolved it into a manufacturer of passenger buses. The company is also responsible for making the Jardinera, a wooden made bus type with seven long benches in rows and two entry points. In 1968, Conrado handed the company to his son Cecilio.

Products
Almazora Motors manufactures the "Family Business" (FB) variant of the Mitsubishi L300 van. The company also assembles bus bodies for Mitsubishi Fuso Truck and Bus Corporation, Isuzu, Hino Motors, MAN Truck & Bus and Mercedes-Benz, as well as truck bodies for special purposes such as fire engines, dump trucks, cargo trucks and ambulances.

Buses

• AMC Tourist Star

• AMC City Star

• Mini Bus

• Special Purpose Bus

Former Models

• AMC Travego 

• AMC Gala

• AMC Lions Coach

• AMC Travel Star

Multi Purpose Vehicles and Asian Utility vehicles

• Mitsubishi L300 FB (Family Business)

• Hyundai H100 Shuttle

• Isuzu D-Max FlexiQube

• 3-Wheeler EV

See also
 List of bus companies of the Philippines

References

External links 
Official site

Bus manufacturers of the Philippines
Vehicle manufacturing companies established in 1925
Truck manufacturers of the Philippines
Companies based in Cavite
Philippine companies established in 1925